Overacting (also referred to as hamming or mugging) refers to acting that is exaggerated. Overacting can be viewed positively or negatively. It is sometimes known as "chewing the scenery".

Uses

Some roles require overly-exaggerated character acting, particularly those in comedy films. For example, the breakthrough roles of Jim Carrey in Ace Ventura: Pet Detective and The Mask (both 1994) saw him portray the lead characters in a very flamboyant fashion, as the script required. He has since played several "straight" roles.

Overacting may be used to portray an outlandish character, or to stress the evil characteristics of a villain. Actor Gary Oldman was almost typecast as an anti-social personality early in his screen career: the necessity to express villainous characters in an overtly physical manner led to the cultivation of a "big" acting style that incorporated projection skills acquired during his stage training. Oldman noted that he has given "over-the-top" performances, but argued, "If it's coming from a sincere place, then I think the screen can hold the epic, and it can hold the very, very small."

Actor Al Pacino, when asked if he overacts, stated: "Well, all actors do, in a way. You know what they say: in the theater you have to reach the balcony." Pacino suggested that directors serve to rein in screen performances that are too large.

Reactions
In an article on overacting, Independent critic Leigh Singer wrote: "Unlike theatre's declamatory projecting to the back row, a 'stagey' performance onscreen isn't a compliment... ultimately, it really is a matter of personal taste." Jeff Labrecque of Entertainment Weekly argued that "there's a thin line between overacting (bad) and acting that you're overacting (bizarrely genius)"; the publication at one time gave year-end awards for "best" and "worst" overacting in film, with the aforementioned Oldman and Pacino winning the former for their performances in Léon: The Professional (1994) and The Devil's Advocate (1997), respectively. Guardian journalist Chris Michael, a proponent of overacting, said: "From Hugo Weaving's Agent Smith to Heath Ledger's Joker to the entire oeuvre of William Shatner, mannered or stylised acting is an underrated skill."

See also
B movie
Melodrama

References

Acting